Lee Duncan is an American character actor.

Films
White Man's Burden (1995) - Police Officer #2

Filmography
 The Mack as Sergeant Duncan
 7th Heaven as Ed
 Cannon as Player
 Darkroom as Steve
 Knight Rider as Clark
 Murder, She Wrote as Police Officer
 Picket Fences as Justice Thomas
 Sanford and Son as Deputy
 Saved by the Bell as Chair Umpire
 Sealab 2021 as Boardroom Actor
 Star Trek as Lieutenant Evans
 The Jersey as Charles Simms
 The Mod Squad as Hanson, First Deputy
 Then Came Bronson as Arthur Tate
 The Odd Couple as Airline Employee
 The Pretender as Detective
 The X-Files as Al Cawdry

External links

American male television actors
American male film actors
Year of birth missing (living people)
Living people